The MTV Europe Music Award for Best Video is an award category presented at the MTV Europe Music Awards. The award was first presented in 1994 under the name Best Director, awarded to Whale's "Hobo Humpin' Slobo Babe". This is the only MTV EMA award - excluding special awards - whose winner is chosen by MTV, rather than by the public. "Hey Ya!", "Born This Way" and "Havana" are the only music videos to also win Best Song. The artists with the most wins are Katy Perry, Justice, Massive Attack and Taylor Swift with two wins each. Taylor Swift is the artist with the most nominations, with six. Swift and Kendrick Lamar are the only performers to have won the award for a video they co-directed: Lamar for "Humble" in 2017 and Swift for "Me!" in 2019.

Winners and nominees
Winners are listed first and highlighted in bold.

† indicates an MTV Video Music Award for Video of the Year–winning video.
‡ indicates an MTV Video Music Award for Video of the Year–nominated video that same year.

1990s

2000s

2010s

2020s

Statistic
As of 2018.

References

See also
 MTV Video Music Award for Video of the Year

MTV Europe Music Awards
Music video awards
Awards established in 1994